Andréas "André" Hermsen (born March 13, 1942 in Hilversum) is a former water polo player from the Netherlands, who finished in seventh position with the Dutch Men's Team at the 1968 Summer Olympics in Mexico City, Mexico. His brothers Henk and Wim also played for the Dutch National Team and competed at the Summer Olympics.

References
 Dutch Olympic Committee

1942 births
Living people
Dutch male water polo players
Olympic water polo players of the Netherlands
Water polo players at the 1968 Summer Olympics
Sportspeople from Hilversum
20th-century Dutch people